Ian Francis Joyce (born July 12, 1985) is an American soccer player who most recently played for Major League Soccer club Colorado Rapids.

Career
Born in Kinnelon, New Jersey, Joyce played high school soccer at Don Bosco Preparatory High School in Ramsey, New Jersey.

Joyce made his debut for Southend United away to Crewe Alexandra, in the 4–3 win in League One on September 20, 2008. He stepped in for the injured Steve Mildenhall, who was declared to be out for up to four weeks after damage to his knee in the previous game. He came on as a half-time sub in Southend's 3–1 win over Brighton & Hove Albion on March 10, 2009, after Steve Mildenhall sustained a minor knee injury. Joyce also started Southend's next game, in the 1–0 victory against Hereford United on 14 March.

Southend United and Joyce mutually agreed to terminate his contract at Roots Hall and on March 9, 2010, he signed for Major League Soccer club Colorado Rapids. He played his first MLS match on August 28, 2010, and helped the Rapids to a 3–0 victory over Houston Dynamo.

Joyce was released by Colorado on November 16, 2012. He entered the 2012 MLS Re-Entry Draft in December 2012 and became a free agent after he went undrafted in both rounds of the draft.

Personal
Joyce is eligible to play in countries within the European Union as he holds an Italian passport.

References

External links

Ian Joyce player profile at southendunited.co.uk
Ian Joyce biography at shupirates.com

1985 births
Living people
People from Kinnelon, New Jersey
Sportspeople from Morris County, New Jersey
American people of Italian descent
American soccer players
Don Bosco Preparatory High School alumni
Soccer players from New Jersey
Seton Hall Pirates men's soccer players
Grays Athletic F.C. players
Watford F.C. players
Southend United F.C. players
Colorado Rapids players
English Football League players
Major League Soccer players
Association football goalkeepers